Justice Whiting may refer to:

Charles S. Whiting (1863–1922), associate justice of the South Dakota Supreme Court
Henry H. Whiting (1923–2012), associate justice of the Supreme Court of Virginia
William Austin Whiting (1855–1908), associate justice of the Supreme Court of Hawaii